Pytheion, also called Pythia Therma, was a town of ancient Bithynia.

Its site is located near Yalova Kap, Asiatic Turkey.

References

Populated places in Bithynia
Former populated places in Turkey
History of Yalova Province